is a railway station in Bungo-Ōno, Ōita Prefecture, Japan. It is operated by JR Kyushu and is on the Hōhi Main Line.

Lines

Layout 
The station consists of two side platforms serving two tracks. The station building is a steel frame structure which houses a waiting room and an automatic ticket vending machine. Access to the opposite side platform is by means of a footbridge.

There is a ticket window in the station building but this became unstaffed in 2016.

Adjacent stations

History
The track was extended westwards in phases, with this station opening as the new western terminus on 23 November 1922. On 2 December 1928, the entire track from Kumamoto through Ogata to Ōita was designated as the Hōhi Main Line. With the privatization of Japanese National Railways (JNR), the successor of JGR, on 1 April 1987, the station came under the control of JR Kyushu.

On 17 September 2017, Typhoon Talim (Typhoon 18) damaged the Hōhi Main Line at several locations. Services between Aso and Nakahanda, including Ogata, were suspended and replaced by bus services. Rail service from Aso through Ogata to Miemachi was restored by 22 September 2017 Normal rail services between Aso and Ōita were restored by 2 October 2017.

Passenger statistics
In fiscal 2015, there were a total of 75,033  boarding passengers, giving a daily average of 206 passengers.

See also
List of railway stations in Japan

References

External links
Ogata (JR Kyushu)

Railway stations in Ōita Prefecture
Railway stations in Japan opened in 1922
Bungo-ōno, Ōita